Canford Magna is a village in Dorset, England. The village is situated just south of the River Stour and lies between the towns of Wimborne Minster and Poole. The village has a mixture of thatch and brick buildings, mostly serving as residences for teaching staff. The western edge of the village merges with the residential suburb of Merley and the village community of Oakley.

The village school was built in 1866 and now serves as the youth club for Canford and Merley.

Canford School
Canford School, a private boarding school is located in the village. The school was previously the mansion and estate of Lord Wimborne. A golf club lies on the edge of the village and the school.

Church
Canford Magna Parish Church is within the village, the oldest part of which is nearly a thousand years old.

References

Villages in Dorset
Bournemouth, Christchurch and Poole
Conservation areas in Dorset